Karageorgievo is a village in the municipality of Aytos Municipality, in Burgas Province, in southeastern Bulgaria.

References

Villages in Burgas Province